Settingiano is a town and comune in the province of Catanzaro in the Calabria region of southern Italy.

Geography
The town is bordered by Caraffa di Catanzaro, Catanzaro, Marcellinara and Tiriolo.

Notes and references

Cities and towns in Calabria